O'Hanlon v Revenue and Customs Commissioners [2007] EWCA Civ 283 is a UK labour law case concerning disability discrimination.

Facts
Mrs O'Hanlon had clinical depression. She had absences from work at the Inland Revenue because of her disability, but also some from unrelated sicknesses. She was paid according to the employers' sick pay rules, that full salary would be given for a maximum of six months and then half pay for a further six months up to a maximum of one year in any four-year period. After that the pension rate of pay would be given. Mrs O'Hanlon argued these rules amounted to discrimination under the DDA 1995 s 3A(1) because the Revenue were failing to pay her fully for illness connected with her disability. Further, she argued that this was breaching the duty to make reasonable adjustments (s 4A). A reasonable adjustment, she suggested, would be full pay after the usual six-month period expired.

The tribunal held that she was not less favourably treated than others and in any case disparate treatment would have been justified since the cost of changing sick pay policy would have been excessive. Furthermore, although Ms O'Hanlon was at a disadvantage because of the sick pay rules, the employers had taken reasonable steps by reducing her hours and transferring her to an easier location (from Welwyn Garden City to Hertford) to commute from after her return. The Employment Appeal Tribunal dismissed her appeal. Mrs O'Hanlon appealed again.

Judgment
The Court of Appeal (Ward, Sedley and Hooper LJJ) dismissed Mrs O'Hanlon's appeal and held in favour of the Revenue. It held that it would be invidious for an employer to have to determine whether to increase sick pay payments for everyone, or separate a disability related element out, merely because it created additional financial hardship for a disabled claimant. Resulting stress from lack of money during sick periods could equally be felt be a non-disabled person who was absent from work for a similar period. Once a tribunal had found that increasing sick pay was not a "reasonable adjustment" (s 4A) the test of justification was satisfied under s 3A(3).

Sedley LJ said the following.

See also
Archibald v Fife Council [2004] ICR 954
Post Office v Jones [2001] ICR 805
Clark v Novocold Ltd [1999] ICR 951

Notes

References

External links
Disability Discrimination Act 1995

United Kingdom labour case law
Court of Appeal (England and Wales) cases
2007 in case law
2007 in British law
HM Revenue and Customs